Nory Ryan's Song, by Patricia Reilly Giff, is about a 12-year-old girl named Nory Ryan  who lives through the Great Famine in Ireland in 1845. When her own beloved sister, Maggie leaves for America, Nory is left with her younger brother Patch, sister Celia, and her Grandpa until their father comes back from a fishing trip. While Nory struggles to find food, money, and pay the ever increasing rent, he father still doesn't come back. She meets Anna Donnelly, an old woman who has a knack for herbs and healing. Can Nory and her family survive the famine?

See also
Children's literature
Orphan
Ruby Holler
The Great Gilly Hopkins
Lily's Crossing
Pictures of Hollis Woods (novel)

References

2000 American novels
American young adult novels